The swimming competition at the 2004 South Asian Games held in Islamabad, Pakistan.

Results

Men's events

Women's events

References

2004 South Asian Games
Swimming at the South Asian Games